Mags D’Arcy is a camogie player, double All Star winner, holder of four All-Ireland Senior Camogie Championship's 2007, 2010, 2011, 2012 & three National League titles in 2009, 2010 and 2011. She has been goalkeeping for the Wexford Senior Camogie Team since 2003 and is regarded as one of the top goalkeepers in the game of camogie. Throughout her time at University College Dublin, D'Arcy helped the college bridge a 19-year gap to capture back the Ashbourne Cup for two years on the trot in 2007 and 2008. Her influential on-field presence and leadership was rewarded with an Ashbourne All Star award. The goalkeeper has also had success within the Poc Fada Camogie Championships, capturing the Leinster title on the double in 2008 and 2009, however due to national championship fixture commitments with Wexford, she was unable to participate at National level in 2008 and 2009. D'Arcy, most recently in 2014, captained Leinster to a provincial title in the Senior Gael Linn Cup. Her captaincy came on the back of winning six Leinster Senior Championship's for her county Wexford. In 2017, she captured her first-ever county camogie senior title with St. Martin's when they defeated Rathnure in the county final.

References

Camogie goalkeepers
Wexford camogie players
1987 births
Living people
UCD camogie players